William Peter Venter (born 29 July 1934, in Johannesburg) is a South African businessman, entrepreneur and industrialist.

Venter founded Allied Electronics Corporation (Altron) in 1965. Acquisitions under his leadership included Bytes Technology Group in 1998 (following a demerger in December 2020, Bytes Technology Group became a listed entity its own right).

Awards
 2006 Top 100 Lifetime Achiever (Sunday Times Business Times)
 1991 Order for Meritorious Service (Gold) (State President of South Africa) for significant contribution to South Africa’s electronics industry
 1989 Leadership in Practice Award (University of South Africa SBL)  
 1984 Top Executive in South Africa (Management)  
 1978 Top Five Businessmen (Business Times)

Degrees
 2004 Master of Philosophy Rand Afrikaans University Business Management cum laude
 2001 Master of Business Administration University of Wales

Honorary degrees
 Doctor of Engineering University of the Witwatersrand 
 Technical Doctorate Technikon Witwatersrand 
 Doctor of Commerce University of the Free State 
 Doctor of Commerce University of Pretoria 
 Doctor of Commerce University of Port Elizabeth 
 Doctor of Science (Engineering) University of Natal, Durban

Personal life
He has four sons and a daughter. Two of his two sons, Robert and Craig, were from his first marriage to Jean Georgina Poole. In 1994, Edith, Venter's second wife and mother of two of his sons, was awarded a record R12-million divorce settlement. She was married for the third time in 1995 to Johannesburg businessman Garth Carstens.
 Robert Eben "Robbie" Venter, born 7 May 1960, is chairman of Aberdare Cables and Director of Bytes Technology Group Ltd., Allied Technologies Ltd (Altech), and Group chief executive of Allied Electronics Corp Ltd (Altron).
 Craig Gordon Venter was born 4 July 1962. He studied at University of California Los Angeles and obtained a BSc (Econ), a BA (Psychology) and an MBA and MSc (Management Science) from University of Southern California.

References

External links
  Who's Who in South Africa

Afrikaner people
South African people of Dutch descent
South African businesspeople
1934 births
Living people